Vlachs in Bosnia and Herzegovina are a Balkan population who descend from Romanized Illyrians (Illyro-Romans), Thracians (Thraco-Romans) and other pre-Slavic Romance-speaking peoples and the South Slavs. They practiced transhumance as herdsmen, shepherds, farmers, and in time developed peculiar socio-political organizational units known as katuns. They traded livestock products. Vlach cheese was reputable because of its fat content and fetched high prices. With their caravans, Vlach carried out much of the traffic between inland and coastal cities such as Dubrovnik. Marko Vego argued that Vlach autochthony with Vlach settlements named after Vlach tribes, Vojnići and Hardomilje, are found near Roman forts and monuments. Bogumil Hrabak supported Vego's assertion that the Vlachs preceded both Turks and Bosnian Slavs in Zachlumia. Dominik Mandić argued that some Vlachs from Herzegovina migrated there from Thessaly, Epirus and Macedonia before the Ottoman invasion into Southern Europe. It is argued that some also arrived from the East during the Ottoman wars.

History
Vlachs are first mentioned in Bosnian documents in c. 1234 by ban Matej Ninoslav. Sources from 1361, 1385, 1399, 1406, 1407, 1408 and 1417 among others mention them in relation to Bosnian bans and kings Vlachs in the Bosnian state of     
Tvrtko I were considered as military element. The relationship of Vlach katuns and feudal holdings can be traced from the 14th century. By 1382 they were under the jurisdiction of the Bosnian ruler, to later be assigned to large landowners. The Vlachs and lords relationships indicate that medieval Bosnia was not compact – some Vlach vassals (Gleđević) of the rulers were far from royal lands. Some Vlach vassals (Nenko Krajsalić, Radoslav Borojević) became vassals fairly late although Kosača ruled certain lands near Eastern banks of Neretva river for fifteen years. Some Vlach vassals (Maleš) were partly Pavlović and partly Kosača vassals although working on Kosača holdings.

In 1382, Vukoslav Piščić was named as knez of all Vlachs by King Tvrtko I of Bosnia. As the earliest noble landowners, in Herzegovina they were assigned to the Sanković noble family, with katun Tomić. In 1409, when Tvrtko I conquered parts of Rascia and Zeta they were located around 100 katuns. They were mentioned as "Vlachorum congregationes et cetus". In the area around Stolac and Zabljak were so many Vlachs that at the end of the 15th century the territory was as Donji Vlasi (Lower Vlachs). The Gornji Vlasi (Upper Vlachs) were only mentioned by Mavro Orbini.

The 1376 and 1454 documents by Republic of Ragusa about trade with Bosnian lands mention Vlachi et Bosgnani. In the 1418 document by Grgur Nikolić, Vlachs, Serbs and Ragusians are clearly distinguished. In the 14th century documents, they are treated as shepherds from mountains that separate Croatia and Bosnia. It is argued that some group of Vlachs in the 14th century migrated to Zagora and Cetina county in Croatia, followed by the sudden appearance of stećaks in the territory they lived. In 1436, on the Cetina are mentioned Vlachs, Croats and Serbs which were  part of Count Ivan Frankopan’s estate.  At a time of social unrest, the Vlachs often fled to the area of Ragusa or Kotor, served in the military of Ragusa during the Ottoman threat, and when most of Herzegovina was occupied by the Ottomans by 1472, once again fled to Ragusan territory.
Some data of historic documents show that a part of Vlachs were Bogomils and they largely contributed to the spread of this sect. 
According to Sima Ćirković, ethnicity's which appear in the medieval texts from Bosnia include names  such as "Bošnjanin", "Vlach", "Latinin" and "Serb".

Ottoman rule 

Ottomans in Bosnia and Herzegovina, following the example of katuns, organized filurîci eflakan (Vlach filurîci) according to "Vlach model" in Smederevo, Vidin and Braničevo. From them was collected taxes baduhava eflakan, or rusum eflak, mostly in the form of sheep or goats, as well gold currency. In the defters of the 1470s and 1480s in Central and North-Central Bosnia, around Visoko and Maglaj, roughly 800 Vlachs arrived accompanied by two Orthodox priests. With war and plagues, and as Catholics fled, the repopulation of Bosnia from Herzegovina and Serbia was of high interest for the Ottomans for their military activities. Benedikt Kuripečič in the 16th century noted that Bosnia is inhabited by three peoples; (Muslim) Turks, (Catholic) Bosnians and (Orthodox) Serbs "who call themselves Vlachs... They came from Smederevo and Belgrade". According to Noel Malcolm in these migrations also participated Serbs and Herzegovinians who were not Vlachs. Since Vlachs weren't paid for military activity by the Ottomans they were permitted to plunder enemy territory, and became known as martolos or voynuk. Their military activity earned them special tax privileges. In the late 15th century at least 35,000 Vlachs lived in Herzegovina, while in the 16th century 82,692 Vlach households lived in the Smederevo region in Serbia.

Within the territories ruled by the Ottoman Empire, Vlach groups moved from southeastern Bosnia (Pavlović area) to central regions of Tešanj and Žepče, also they spread northwest and north of the Sava towards the future Bosanska Krajina. Living on the border of Habsburg Empire they relocated if the social situation was better on the other part of the border. There they received also a special social-militarh system. Before 1516, Vlachs settled nahia Vrbanja, Prusac, Glamoč and Kupres. In 1527 Ferdinand I freed them from feudal obligations, shared booty with them, gave them their own captains (vojvodas) and magistrates (knezes), and freed them to practice Orthodox Christianity. It eventually led to the organisation of the Military Frontier, and the decree Statuta Valachorum by Ferdinand II. It resulted in a situation almost looking like Vlachs fighting against Vlachs.

Herzegovinian Vlachs

In Southeastern Herzegovina between 1393–1437 many Vlach katuns emerged. The primary lords of the Herzegovinian Vlachs were the Kosača, Pavlović, and Nikolić noble families. The Vlachs from Herzegovina sometime plundered lands of Republic of Ragusa in the 14th and 15th century and grew rich by trade of goods between Ragusa and the mines of Bosnia.

Vlachs were surnamed Pliščić, Gleđević, Ugarac, Boban, Mirilović, Vragović, Kresojević, Nenković, Bančić, Pilatovac, Pocrnja, Drobnjak and Riđani. Some of the Banjani and Maleševci (Stanković) were Kosača vassals.

Vlachs surnamed Vlahović, Žurović, and Predojević, those belonging to the Pribač Nikolić pasture encampment, and some of the Banjan and Maleševac Vlachs (surnamed Hrebeljanović, Milićiević and Milošević) were Pavlovlić vassals.

The Kutlovići were vassals of the Nikolići. The Primilovići belonged to a larger group of Vlachs, for whom no data on lords were found.

Other katun Vlachs were Boljuni, Bukvići, Burmazi, Goduni, Hardomilići, Horojevići, Hrabreni, Jurjevići, Kersojevići, Kićurići, Kujavići, Milobradačići, Perventinići, Pribinovići, Rudinjani, Veseličići, Vitkovići, Vojnovići, Vragovići, Zotovići.

Vlachs often don't bear "tribe-katun" name as a surname, instead using patronymics, for example katunar Dragić Dobrilović from Boban katun or katunars Klapac Stanković and Radosav Milićević from Maleševac katun.

The Ottoman occupation conquered Vlach territories which caused migrations; Ragusan documents in 1386 recorded that some Vlach with their animals found shelter in Ston and Pelješac (...quod recipiantur in Stagno familie, pastores, animalia et carnesia Vlacorum et circum vicinorum propter eorum saluamentum terrore Teucrurum partes discurrentium), in 1466 Korita, Banjani and Riđani east of Trebinje fell. In 1448 Ragusa again accepted in Ston and Pelješac "peasants and Vlachs of duke Stjepan, Radoje Nikolić and Vukašin Grgurević with families and herds, with leaders and shepherds", as well in 1463 (Vlachs and people from Popovo). During the 15th century they continuously found shelter in the territory of Ragusan Republic, as well Venetian Dalmatia and Bay of Kotor. In 1475–1477 in the nahija Počitelj eleven deserted villages (Gojanovići, Ričica, Kukrica, Opličiča, Plešivac, Svitava, Šanica, Kozica, Gornja Ljubinica, Skočim, Dretelj) were recorded, which were held by the Vlachs. At the time many Vlachs (generally, and from Banjani, Maleševci, Bobani, Zubci) collaborated with Ottomans as slave agents.

Culture

They lived in small villages called katun whose chieftain were titled katunar. Around them they placed guards: guard stations were called varde or vardišta. They practiced transhumance as herdsmen and shepherds, and became agricultural when settled permanently. They exported livestock products; animal skin, wool, cheese, butter and dried meat. Other exports included honey and wood. The Vlach cheese was reputable because of fat, and in 1325 sold one libra for 10 folars compared to other cheese that sold for 8 folars. In 1420 Vlach cheese was sold for 15 folars. With their caravans, led by kramar, mostly composed of horses numbering between 10–100, they conducted a large part of the trade between inland and coastal cities. Their military tradition and mobile lifestyle was used by the Bosnian lords and later by the Ottomans. These traits changed very little over the centuries.

The emergence of the stećaks and their symbolism in Bosnia and Herzegovina by the scholars is often related to Vlach communities.

Language
Vlachs probably were bilingual (speaking a language close to Romanian and Slavic languages). Many personal names in the records, of which many are preserved, indicate their bilingualism. Initially Vlachs used an Ikavian accent and later I/jekavian accent (spreading it further), of Neo-Shtokavian dialect of Serbo-Croatian. Those who migrated to the West during Ottoman invasion spoke what are now labeled Eastern Herzegovinian and Bosnian–Dalmatian subdialects. LZMK linguist Nataša Bašić argued that the Vlachs were creators of New-Shtokavian dialect with reduced number of cases in declination, with New-Shtokavian accent, with the loss of the phoneme /H/, with diphthongization old jat and other modifications characteristic for foreigners, especially for Romans. Ćiro Truhelka argued that the evasion of the writing and spelling letter /H/ in Serbian language until Karadžić's reform is due to Vlachs influence as it is a Romance language characteristic.

Truhelka noted many preserved non-Slavic family surnames in Bosnia and Herzegovina of Vlach origin, which are often Slavicized by suffixes ić, ović and ević, with most notable being; Banjan, Balac, Bilbija, Boban, Bokan, Banduka, Bencun, Belen, Bender, Besara, Bovan, Čokorilo, Darda, Doman, Drečo, Đerman, Gac, Gala, Jarakula, Kalin, Kešelj, Keser, Kočo, Kalaba, Kokoruš, Kosor, Lopar, Macura, Mataruga, Pađen, Palavestra, Punja, Riđan, Šola, Šolaja, Šabat, Šurla, Šatra, Škipina, Špira, Tubin, Taor, Tintor, as well Kecman, Šikman, Toroman, Šuman, Karan, Šurlan, Servan.

Religion
Pope Gregory XI in 1372 letter for Franciscans in Bosnia ordered them to convert Vlachs who live in tents and pastures (Wlachorum... quorum nonnulli in pascuis et tentoriis habitant). Their religion depended upon social and political events. During Ottoman occupation the Orthodox Church was more politically favored than Roman Catholic. The first Orthodox churches in Bosnia and Herzegovina were built in the 13th century on its eastern reaches. Before the arrival of the Ottomans, on the Bosnian proper the Orthodox Church had some presence as the Serbian Orthodox Church, limited exclusively to areas adjoined to the Kingdom of Bosnia by Tvrtko I's conquests in a lands to the east across the Drina River, traditionally under Serbian suzerainty. In the Eastern Herzegovina there was Eparchy of Zachlumia and the Littoral and it held a much prominent role. In the 16th century, although Ottoman law prohibited building of new churches, several Orthodox monasteries were built, notably in Tavna, Lomnica, Paprača, Ozren and Gostović, while Rmanj Monastery in northwestern Bosnia was first mentioned in 1515. According to Noel Malcolm, Orthodox believers were often oppressed and humiliated, although he asserts that Ottoman regime favored the Orthodox Church compared to the Roman Catholic church. Under Christian rule a significant proportion of the churches in present-day Herzegovina were only built under Ottoman rule. Several larger monasteries were built for the needs of the hierarchy such as Žitomislić by the Neretva, Tvrdoš near Trebinje, Nikoljac (in Bijelo Polje), the Holy Trinity in Pljevlja and Piva. The example of Herzegovina reveals that the immigrant Vlach herdsmen had more economic power and they were more religious than their predecessors who lived there under Christian lords. With time the Slavicized Vlachs who were of Orthodox faith were eventually Serbianized, and those of Roman Catholic faith were Croatized., while others who embraced Islam became Muslims (modern-days Bosniaks).

Legacy
Ilona Czamańska claim that "The majority of Serbs from the Republika Srpska of modern Bosnia is of Vlach origin, as well as the majority of the population from Bosnia and Herzegovina in general"(This also applies to the entire Western Balkans as a mixture of Slavic and indigenous population), but also states that "there are none direct sources to support Vlach colonization of these lands." Serbian Orthodox Church have a decisive role in the process of  national identification of Vlachs in Croatia and Bosnia and Herzegovina who became Serbs while Catholic Vlachs became Croats. Today only a small part of former Vlachs declares with this name. According to Bogumil Hrabak, Vlachs katuns which exist in Herzegovina with old Balkan, ethnically probably Arbanas basis does not mean that ancient Slavs of Herzegovina were all Arbanas. Considering it was a transit area and before 1330, Vlachs arrived from several directions, most Herzegovinian katuns came from Serbia and Albania that is, from Thessaly and Epirus, the main Vlach areas in the Balkans. According to Noel Malcolm, today it makes no sense to claim that Bosnian Serbs are "actually" Vlachs because members of the Serbian Orthodox Church over time crossed the Drina and moved to Bosnia or moved north from Herzegovina, but not all people who settled northern Bosnia in the 15th and 16th century were Vlachs. There were too many arrivals and departures to determine what is the percentage of Vlach ancestors of Bosnian Serbs since the Vlachs did not only contribute to the growth of the Serbian population, Vlachs mostly in Croatia converted to the Catholic faith, and many of them in Bosnia converted to Islam.

Notable Bosnian Vlachs
Hasan Pasha Predojević (c. 1530 – 22 June 1593) – the Predojević Vlachs are first mentioned 1372, while since 1468 were included in the Ottoman hierarchy.

See also
Vlachs
Morlachs
Vlach law
Vlachs of Croatia
Tribes of Montenegro
Vlachs in medieval Serbia
Vlach (Ottoman social class)

References

Sources

Further reading
 
 
 
 
 
 
 
 
 
 
 
 
 

History of the Aromanians
Medieval Bosnia and Herzegovina